Ghassanieh  (غسانية)  is a small town in southern Lebanon with a population of about 8000 people.  It is 14 kilometres southeast of Sidon, bordered by Kawatria Al Sayyad to the east, Al Babebliah to the west, Kakyiat Sanawbar to the northwest, and Khartoum to the southeast. The name of the town, Ghassanieh, is derived from the clan of Alghassasina.

Economy
The town of Ghassanieh was originally an industrial town, manufacturing brooms and brushes for the Lebanese market. Immigration started in the 19th century and intensified during World War I, with a group of young men emigrating to Latin America to escape conscription in the Ottoman empire army.

This emigration continued through the 20th century and again intensified during the 1940s and 1950s, this time to West Africa, where the immigrants engaged in trade and industry.

In a second wave of immigration, many returned to Lebanon, some temporarily and some permanently, to join the booming construction business. Ghassanieh companies were involved in commercial and residential construction in Beirut and its suburbs for more than 60 years.

The third wave of emigration was focussed mainly on education in Europe, Canada, and the US. Today, a large group of engineers, medical doctors, and management professionals in ISO and other international standards are involved in spreading a culture of knowledge and continuous development.

Others were involved in international investments and are still residents or citizens around the world in: Argentina, Brazil, USA, Canada, Australia, France, UK, Switzerland, Netherland, Sweden, Germany, Belgium, Liberia, Ivory Coast, Ghana, Nigeria, Angola, Namibia, Qatar, UAE, KSA, Syria, Egypt, Jordan, Iraq, Iran, Turkey, Somalia, Jibouti, Senegal, Benin, Sudan, South Africa, Zambia, Zimbabwe, Guinea, Siraleone and many others.

Ghassanieh became a global village as a result of its ambitions to grow and develop its way of life. The people of Ghassanieh cross all barriers in pursuit of their dreams and return to their village to build and develop it.

Modern era
On 7 August 2006, during the 2006 Lebanon War, Israeli war planes killed seven people in the village.

References

Bibliography

External links
Ghassaniyeh, Localiban 
https://web.archive.org/web/20080724175419/http://www.lebanonatlas.com/lebanonmajorcities/South/Ghassanieh/index.htm
http://wikimapia.org/4202286/ar/al-ghassanieh-%D8%A7%D9%84%D8%BA%D8%B3%D8%A7%D9%86%D9%8A%D8%A9

Populated places in Sidon District